This is a list of organisations who promote a moderation of the size of the human population.

Intergovernmental organizations

Worldwide

Regional

Asia-Oceania
 All countries – Asian Forum of Parliamentarians on Population and Development

Asia, Caribbean, North and Sub-Saharan Africa, Latin America and Middle East
 Partners in Population and Development

Governmental organizations

India
National Commission on Population

Non-governmental organizations

Australia

Sustainable Population Australia

Ethiopia

Population, health, and the environment (PHE)

Germany

German Foundation for World Population

India

Population Foundation of India

Italy

Rientrodolce

Madagascar

Blue Ventures

Netherlands

Rutgers WPF
The Ten Million Club

Switzerland

Ecopop

Uganda

Conservation Through Public Health (Population Health Environment programme)

United Kingdom

Population Matters  (previously the Optimum Population Trust)

United States

Californians for Population Stabilization
Center for Biological Diversity
Earth Policy Institute
National Commission for the Observance of World Population Year 1974
Negative Population Growth
NumbersUSA
Population Action International
Population Connection (called Zero Population Growth until 2002)
Population Council
Population Media Center
Population Reference Bureau
Worldwatch Institute

Academic researchers
 Population Europe

Political groups
Australia – Stop Population Growth Now
Australia – Sustainable Australia

Religious groups
United States – Church of Euthanasia

See also 
Human overpopulation
Overshoot (population)
Human population planning
:Category:Population concern political parties

References 

 
Human overpopulation
Population